The 2011 Monaco Grand Prix, formally the Formula 1 Grand Prix de Monaco 2011, was held on 29 May 2011 at the Circuit de Monaco in Monte Carlo, Monaco. Sixth round of the 2011 Formula One season, the 78 lap race was won by the championship leader, Red Bull Racing's Sebastian Vettel who started from pole position. Ferrari's Fernando Alonso was second and McLaren's Jenson Button third.

Winner Vettel extended his lead in the World Drivers' Championship to 58 points over Lewis Hamilton who was sixth. Mark Webber finished fourth and maintained third place in the championship, six points behind Hamilton in third and three ahead of Button. In the World Constructors' Championship, Red Bull extended its lead over McLaren to 61 points, with Ferrari being a further 68 points behind.

Report

Background
Many of the drivers were initially concerned that the Drag Reduction System (DRS) would prove to be unsafe on the narrow streets of the principality, and so lobbied to have the device banned for the duration of the weekend. Following increased pressure from the drivers and FOTA, the FIA agreed to ban the use of the DRS in the tunnel for free practice and qualifying.

Tyre supplier Pirelli brought its yellow-banded soft compound tyre as the harder "prime" tyre and the red-banded super-soft compound as the softer "option" compound, as opposed to the previous year where Bridgestone brought the medium compound as the "prime" tyre. The Monaco grand prix marked the debut of the Pirelli red-banded super-soft compound.

In the build-up to the race, Hispania Racing team principal Colin Kolles suggested that the team would submit an official protest to the FIA over the use of off-throttle blown diffusers. Hispania had planned for an upgrade that would include the device for the  before the FIA declared off-throttle blown diffusers to be a moveable aerodynamic device, and therefore illegal. Hispania then proceeded to abandon the planned upgrade. However, the FIA reversed their decision shortly before the Spanish Grand Prix, instead nominating to discuss the matter with the sport's technical working group. Kolles declared that his team believed the off-throttle blown diffuser concept to be illegal, and was considering a protest before the Monaco Grand Prix.

Sebastian Vettel and Lewis Hamilton were first and second at the previous Grand Prix, the week before in Spain; and although they were also first and second in the Drivers' Championship at this point in the season - the gap was not as close as it was in the Grand Prix. Vettel's 4 wins from 5 races had given him 118 points, 41 more than Hamilton's 77 points. Third in the standings was Mark Webber, 10 behind on 67, and Jenson Button was 6 behind him on 61. Fernando Alonso was fifth with 51 points - less than half Vettel's total.

Red Bull Racing led the Constructors' Championship with 185 points and McLaren were second on 138 points (47 behind). Ferrari were third on 75 points and the battle for fourth raged on between Renault and Mercedes GP - who were on 46 and 40 points respectively. Before this race, Williams had had the worst start to a season in their history and were yet to score any points.

Qualifying

In the third part of qualifying, Sergio Pérez crashed after exiting the tunnel, an accident similar to Nico Rosberg's in the earlier free practice session. However, Pérez was not so lucky as he smashed into the barrier used to separate the track and escape road, and qualifying had to be red flagged for more than half an hour, while Pérez was extricated from the car and the barrier was repaired.  This meant that in the 2:26 time left, none of the remaining nine cars could improve their times due to the lack of heat and performance in their tyres. That meant that Vettel, who already had set the second fastest qualifying time in Monaco history, and Button who had set their times earlier in the session were better off than drivers who did not. Pérez's impact with the barrier was similar to Sauber driver Karl Wendlinger's crash in the run-up to the 1994 Monaco Grand Prix. As expected, the improved safety regulations resulted in Pérez's injuries being less severe, as he suffered a concussion and a sprained thigh.

Neither Hispania driver was able to record a lap time during the qualifying session; Liuzzi due to damage sustained during the earlier practice session, and Karthikeyan due to a gearbox and a rear suspension failure. However, in line with the 107% rule the team were allowed to enter the race due to posting competitive times during earlier free practice. Kamui Kobayashi and Jaime Alguersuari had also been called to the stewards' room after Kobayashi slowed down whilst coming into the pits, blocking Alguersuari who was on a flying lap in the first part of the session.

Race

Vettel won the start from pole and led Button to the first corner, with Alonso getting around a slow starting Webber for third. Hamilton started ninth in the position vacated by Pérez but made little progress on the opening lap. Vettel went 2.4 seconds ahead of Button by the end of the first lap. Schumacher's anti-stall kicked in at the start  dropping him to tenth at first corner, but he retook ninth from Hamilton at Grand-Hotel hairpin. Vettel continued to build a strong lead but his pit stop on lap 16 was slow and he was fitted with hard compound tyres due to a radio communication error. Alonso briefly led then but when he pitted on Lap 17 Button went to the lead. He stayed there until Lap 33 when he pitted and Vettel once again resumed the lead.

On lap 30 Glock's rear left suspension broke, so there were yellow flags for a brief period while they removed his car.

An incident between Hamilton and Massa caused Massa to crash in the tunnel, bringing out the first safety car. At the same time Schumacher's car suffered an airbox fire as he was about to pit, and he retired in the pit entrance forcing a safety car period while they cleared both cars. Vettel found himself leading behind the safety car and when racing resumed a battle between Vettel, Alonso and Button began. Vettel held the two former world champions behind him, despite being on tyres that had lasted since lap 16. As Button and Alonso fought for second place, the race looked set for an exciting climax, when an accident occurred involving Hamilton, Sutil, Alguersuari and Petrov. Sutil had hit the barrier on the previous corner, causing a right-rear puncture. Hamilton braked as Sutil lost control, and Alguersuari then ran into the back of Hamilton, damaging Hamilton's rear wing. Alguersuari hit the barrier, causing Petrov to do the same and both cars were out of the race, with Petrov being briefly trapped in his car. This brought out the safety car again and on lap 72 the race was red flagged, with the cars stopping on the grid at lap 72. During the red flag period, teams were allowed to change tyres and work on cars (unlike most motorsport, where tyre changes are not permitted during the red flag unless it is for a change of weather conditions). This worked to the advantage of Vettel, Alonso, and Hamilton. Vettel and Alonso had heavily used tyres, while Hamilton most likely would not have been able to finish the race with the damaged rear wing that required almost the entire red flag period to repair.

After Petrov was extracted from his car and the track cleared, the race resumed still behind the safety car, which went in at the end of lap 73. On lap 74 there was a brief yellow flag period due to an incident between Hamilton and Maldonado, ending Maldonado's race with a broken front suspension. Vettel took the chequered flag, extending his lead in the world championship to 58 points. Vettel was closely followed by Alonso in second, with Button taking the final podium spot.

Hamilton had a difficult day, being penalised for causing two avoidable accidents, one involving Massa (for which he was given a drive-through penalty), and another with Maldonado for which he received a post-race 20 second penalty which did not affect his sixth placing. In an interview with BBC Sport, Hamilton criticised the stewards after the race, saying "Out of six races, I've been to the stewards five times. It's a joke, it's an absolute frickin' joke." He later apologised.

Classification

Qualifying

 – Lewis Hamilton had his only Q3 time of 1:15.280 deleted for cutting the chicane, demoting him from 7th to 9th on the grid. But despite making it into the top 10, he was allowed to choose whatever tyre he wanted to start on.
 – Sergio Pérez was injured and deemed unfit for the race by doctors after crashing heavily at the Nouvelle Chicane in the final period of qualifying. Everyone else moved up one position on the grid to fill his place.
 – Vitantonio Liuzzi and Narain Karthikeyan failed to set a lap time in qualifying after both cars were damaged in free practice. However, both cars set a practice time within the 107% standard during the final practice session,  and the stewards allowed both drivers to race.

Race

Notes:
 – Lewis Hamilton was given a 20-second penalty post-race, for causing an avoidable collision with Pastor Maldonado, but he didn't lose any place after receiving it.
 – Pastor Maldonado crashed at Sainte Dévote on lap 73 after a collision with Lewis Hamilton, but he was classified as he had completed more than 90% of the winner's distance.

Championship standings after the race 

Drivers' Championship standings

Constructors' Championship standings

 Note: Only the top five positions are included for both sets of standings.

See also 
 2011 Monaco GP2 Series round

References

External links

Monaco
Monaco Grand Prix
Grand Prix
May 2011 sports events in Europe